Museum card (Finnish: museokortti) is the shared museum entrance ticket of the Finnish Museums Association. As of June 2021 the card grants access to 327 museums throughout Finland (including the autonomous region of Åland).

The museum card was launched in 2015 and during its first three months 16 000 cards were purchased. At the beginning the card cost €54  for a year and granted access to over 200 museums.

The museum card has reportedly grown in popularity despite the COVID-19 pandemic in 2020 when 200 000 cards were purchased and 70 per cent of the card holders renewed their expired card. In total the card brought in 10,1 million euros for the Finnish museums. The cost of the card is 72 euros for a year and it can also be installed as an application to a smartphone.

In 2019 the most visited museums among the card holders were:

References 

Museums in Finland